Schlitz may refer to:

 Joseph Schlitz Brewing Company
 Schlitz, Hesse, a town in Germany
 Schlitz (river), a river in Germany

People with the surname
 Don Schlitz (born 1952), award-winning country music songwriter
 Joseph Schlitz (1831–1875), German entrepreneur
 Laura Amy Schlitz (21st century), American author

German-language surnames